was a town located in Onsen District, Ehime Prefecture, Japan.

As of 2003, the town had an estimated population of 11,159 and a density of 100.66 persons per km². The total area was 110.86 km².

On September 21, 2004, Kawauchi, along with the town of Shigenobu (also from Onsen District), was merged to create the city of Tōon and no longer exists as an independent municipality.

External links
Tōon official website 

Dissolved municipalities of Ehime Prefecture
Tōon, Ehime